Jenő Illés (28 January 1879 in Debrecen -  17 October 1951 in Budapest) was a Hungarian cinematographer and film director. He worked for most of his career in the German film industry and is often credited as Eugen Illés.

Partial filmography
Director
 The Lady with the Mask (1913)
 Monna Vanna (1916)
 Alraune, die Henkerstochter, genannt die rote Hanne (1918)
 Mania (1918)
 Struggling Souls (1918)
 Seelen im Sturm (1920)
 The Railway King (1921)
 Jeremias (1922)
 The Strumpet's Plaything (1922)
 The Fall of Jerusalem (1922)
 The Doomed (1924)
 That Dangerous Age (1927)

Bibliography
 Cunningham, John. Hungarian Cinema: From Coffee House to Multiplex. Wallflower Press, 2004.

External links

1879 births
1951 deaths
Hungarian film directors
Hungarian cinematographers
People from Debrecen